Sir George Mowlem Burt KBE (10 January 1884 – 1 September 1964) was a British businessman and fencer, as well as a descendant of George Burt and John Mowlem.

Biography
Born in Westminster, he was educated at Clifton College, where he first took up fencing. He later competed in the individual and team épée events at the 1920 Summer Olympics, being eliminated in the first round in both competitions. In 1922, he won the épée title at the British Fencing Championships.

Running his predecessor's construction firm, he involved himself in numerous projects, including the building of the BBC headquarters and the Port of London Authority building, as well as the rebuilding of Buckingham Palace following World War II. He was knighted by George VI of the United Kingdom in 1942 and died in 1964 in Blindley Heath, Surrey.

References

1884 births
1964 deaths
British male fencers
Olympic fencers of Great Britain
Fencers at the 1920 Summer Olympics